The Conscious Daughters (TCD) were an American female hip hop duo from the Bay Area, California, United States, consisting of Carla "CMG" Green and Karryl "Special One" Smith. The duo signed in 1993 to Paris's record label, Scarface Records, after passing him a demo tape at a club.  They released their first studio album, Ear to the Street.

The single and video release of their 1994 single,  "Somethin' to Ride To (Fonky Expedition)", helped TCD gain national recognition.  Soon after, they were signed by Priority/EMI Records and released their second album, Gamers. Many collaborations, projects and television appearances followed, most notably Rap City, MTV Jams, and Soul Train.

In 2007, Nas released the track "Where Are They Now (West Coast Remix)" which featured Breeze, Kam, King Tee, Candyman, Threat, Ice-T, Sir Mix-A-Lot and TCD.

Their third album, The Nutcracker Suite, was released on Guerrilla Funk Records on February 10, 2009. In 2010, TCD severed their relationship with Guerrilla Funk Records, and in 2011 they signed a distribution deal with Phaseone/Sony.

On December 10, 2011, Smith was found dead at her home.  Initially, the cause of death was unknown, but it was eventually determined to be from complications associated with blood clots that reached her lungs.

Discography

Studio albums
Ear to the Street (1993)
Gamers (1996)
The Nutcracker Suite (2009)

Solo projects
CMG - The Jane of All Trades (2011)

Singles
"Somethin' to Ride To (Fonky Expedition)" (1993)
"We Roll Deep" (1993)
"Sticky Situation" (1993)
"Gamers" (1996)

References

External links

Conscious Daughters | Hip Hop from Oakland, CA
M.I.S.S. » Maintenance Mode

Hip hop groups from California
Women hip hop groups
African-American girl groups
American women rappers
African-American women rappers
Musical groups from Oakland, California
American musical duos
Hip hop duos
Musical groups established in 1985
1985 establishments in California